The Churchill-Hilger House is a historic house at Main and Searcy Street in Pangburn, Arkansas.  It is a single-story wood-frame structure, basically vernacular in appearance with some Craftsman detailing.  It has a hip roof from which hip-roof dormers project, and a recessed L-shaped porch that wraps around the northern (front) and western facades.  The house was built in 1914 for Harry Churchill, one of the leading businessmen responsible for Pangburn's economic success in the early 20th century.  Churchill arrived in Pangburn in 1899, and built up a lucrative business manufacturing railroad ties, and successfully lobbied for the construction of the railroad through the town.  At the time of the house's construction, it was considered somewhat lavish.

The house was listed on the National Register of Historic Places in 1991.

See also
National Register of Historic Places listings in White County, Arkansas

References

Houses on the National Register of Historic Places in Arkansas
Houses completed in 1914
Houses in White County, Arkansas
National Register of Historic Places in White County, Arkansas
1914 establishments in Arkansas
Bungalow architecture in Arkansas
American Craftsman architecture in Arkansas